Nayakudu is a 2005 Indian Telugu-language action film directed by Kodi Ramakrishna. A remake of the Malayalam film Runway (2004), the film stars Rajasekhar and Namitha while Nassar, Rami Reddy and Riyaz Khan play supporting roles. The plot follows Raju (Rajasekhar) who pretends to his family that he worked in Dubai, however, he is a smuggling kingpin who goes by the name Spirit Sambasiva. The film is released on 15 September 2005.

Plot

Cast 

Rajasekhar as Rajagopalam "Raju" alias Spirit Sambasiva
Namitha as Uma
Nassar as Razzaq
Rami Reddy  as Vadayar
Riyaz Khan as Venugopal
Thalaivasal Vijay
Raghu Babu
Giri Babu
GV Sudhakar
Benarjee
K.R. Vijaya as Bharatamma
Jeeva
Ahuti Prasad
Narsing Yadav
O Kalyan
Ramesh
Harsha
Prudhvi
Varsha 
Amit Kumar

Production 
Kodi Ramakrishna who collaborated with Rajasekhar for several films including Ankusam teamed up after a hiatus. The film began its production in February 2005.

Soundtrack 
Music by Koti.

Release and reception
The film released in mid-September.

MM of The Hindu called it a "neat action film" and wrote, "Though the film is full of sentiment and love, the basic backdrop is action. Some scenes look cinematic, but they are passable." Reviewing the film for Zamin Ryot, Griddaluru Gopalrao appreciated the storyline and performances. He stated that director Kodi Ramakrishna had succeeded in adapting Runway in a Telugu setting. On the other hand, a critic from Sify called it "avoidable," adding, "The story and presentation of director Kodi Ramakrishna is old wine in new bottle. The shot takings and situations are all taken in an old fashioned manner which makes the proceedings move at snail pace."

References

External links 
 

 Telugu remakes of Malayalam films